The Dragon School is one school on two sites in Oxford, England. The Dragon Pre-Prep (children aged 4–7) and Prep School (children aged 8–13) are both co-educational schools. The Dragon Prep School was founded in 1877 as the Oxford Preparatory School. It takes day pupils and boarders.

Originally established for boys, the Dragon School also accepted a small number of day girls with a close connection to the school, first admitting girls as boarders in 1994. The Dragon School is a feeder school to many independent schools, including Winchester College, Eton College, Shrewsbury School, Oundle School, Cheltenham Ladies' College, Harrow School, Radley College, Rugby School, Marlborough College, Wellington College, Canford School, St Edward's School, Oxford, Stowe School and Abingdon School.

The Dragon educates children from aged 4 to 13 in two sites in North Oxford: Bardwell Road and Richards Lane. Boarding starts at 8 and there are 10 boarding houses, including one weekly-boarding house.

History

The school was founded by a committee of Oxford dons, among whom the most active was a Mr George. In honour of Saint George the group decided to call themselves Dragons.

Teaching started in September 1877 at rooms in Balliol Hall, located in St Giles', central Oxford, under A. E. Clarke. The school expanded and moved within two years to 17 Crick Road, which became known as "School House". Charles Cotterill Lynam (known as the "Skipper") took over as headmaster in 1886.

In 1894, Lynam took out a lease on land at the current site at Bardwell Road in central North Oxford, just to the west of the River Cherwell. £4,000 was raised through subscriptions from local parents for the erection of new school buildings and the move was completed within a year. The school was known as Oxford Preparatory School and also Lynam's, but gradually its current name was adopted.

The Dragon School became the second school to take part in the Harrow History Prize in 1895, and many of its pupils have won this over the years, an early winner being Kit Lynam. The school was run for many years by the Lynam family. 

The school has become notable for its large number of eminent alumni.

Heads
The following have been Heads of the school, several from the Lynam family:

 A. E. Clarke 1877–1886
 C. C. Lynam ("Skipper") 1886–1920
 A. E. Lynam ("Hum") 1920–1942
 J. H. R. Lynam ("Joc") 1942–1965
 R. K. Ingram ("Inky") 1965–1989
 M. W. A. Gover ("Guv") 1972–1989 (head of day pupils, co-headmaster with "Inky")
 N. P. V. Richardson 1989–1992
 H. E. P. Woodcock 1992–1993
 Roger S. Trafford 1993–2002
 John R. Baugh 2002–2017
 Crispin Hyde-Dunn 2017–2021
 Emma Goldsmith 2021–present

Old Dragons

Former pupils of the Dragon School are referred to as Old Dragons. The following people were pupils at one time:

See also
 Wychwood School, located at the opposite end of Bardwell Road

References

Further reading
James Bruce Lockhart, Alan Macfarlane, Dragon Days: The Dragon School, Oxford, 1949–1955 (CreateSpace Independent Publishing, 2013)

External links

 

1877 establishments in England
Educational institutions established in 1877
 
Schools in Oxford
Boarding schools in Oxfordshire
Co-educational boarding schools
Preparatory schools in Oxfordshire
Private schools in Oxfordshire